Andrew F. Tully Jr. (October 24, 1914 - September 27, 1993) was an American war reporter, writer and columnist. He also wrote some 18 fiction and non-fiction books, translated in multiple languages. As a war reporter for the Boston Traveler, he was one of the few American journalists to enter Berlin with the Russians in April 1945. He wrote the column Capital Fare from 1961 until 1987.

Early life
Tully was born in Southbridge, Mass., where he began his newspaper career at the Southbridge News the summer after graduating from high school. At the age of 21 he became the youngest newspaper publisher in the United States when he purchased the weekly Southbridge Press.

Bibliography
1947: Era of Elegance
1949: Yankee Salesman
1958: Treasury Agent: The Inside Story
1960: When They Burned the White House, illustrated by Milton Glaser (reprinted 1961)
1960: A Race of Rebels
1962: Capitol Hill
1962: CIA: The Inside Story (translated in French, 1962, and Vietnamese, 1988)
1963: Berlin: Story Of A Battle (translated in Dutch, French (1963, reprinted 1969), Italian (1963) and Japanese; reprinted 1977)
1963: Supreme Court
1964: Where Did Your Money Go?: The Foreign Aid Story (with Milton Britten)
1966: The F.B.I.'s Most Famous Cases (translated in French, 1967, and Italian, 1968)
1967: White Tie and Dagger
1967: The Time of the Hawk
1969: The Super Spies
1973: The Secret War Against Dope
1974: The Brahmin Arrangement
1980: Inside the FBI (reprinted 1987)
2010: Andrew Tully on Everything (a collection of 100 columns)

Notes

1914 births
1993 deaths
American war correspondents of World War II
American columnists